In the Beginning is the sixth studio album by the New York hardcore band Cro-Mags. It was released on June 19, 2020 and marks the band's first album in two decades.

Reception
Exclaim! praised the album and spoke of the band's legacy saying "a real treat to see them reaffirm that legacy, proving that they haven't gotten too old for this shit, nor have they lost any of their fire." Punknews.org awarded the album 4.5 stars (out of a possible 5) and called the album "beautiful art."

Track listing

Personnel
Personnel per booklet.

Cro-Mags
 Harley Flanagan – bass, lead vocals
 Rocky George – lead guitar, backing vocals
 Gabby Abularach – rhythm guitar
 Garry Sullivan – drums

Additional musicians
 Carlos "Lamont" Cooper – cello
 Phil Campbell – rhythm guitar
 Reilly – backing vocals
 Harley Karsten Flanagan – backing vocals
 Jonah Odin Flanagan – backing vocals

Production
 Harley Flanagan – production
 John Ferrara – recording
 Brian Joya – recording
 Arthur Rizk – production, mastering, mixing
 Todd Campbell – assistant engineer
 Brandon Chase – design, layout
 Laura Lee Flanagan – photography
 Balazs Szabo – photography
 Brooke Smith-Lubensky – photography
 Steve Butcher – photography

References

2020 albums
Cro-Mags albums